Torrimar is a rapid transit station in San Juan agglomeration, Puerto Rico. It is located between Jardines and Martínez Nadal stations on the sole line of the Tren Urbano system, in Frailes barrio of Guaynabo. The station is named after the Torrimar neighborhood which it serves. The trial service ran in 2004, however, the regular service only started on 6 June 2005.

Nearby 
 Garden Hills neighborhood
 Suchville neighborhood
 Torrimar neighborhood
 Torrimar Sports Complex

References

Tren Urbano stations
Railway stations in the United States opened in 2004
2004 establishments in Puerto Rico